Sivasubramaniam  is a Tamil name and may refer to
 
Sivasubramaniam Raveendranath, Sri Lankan Tamil academic
Sivasubramaniam Kathiravelupillai, Sri Lankan Tamil lawyer and politician
Sivasubramaniam Pathmanathan, Sri Lankan Tamil historian
V. Sivasubramaniam, Sri Lankan Tamil judge

Tamil masculine given names